Belinda Laracuente (born 1980) is a women's boxing competitor from Mayagüez, Puerto Rico, where she lived from 1989 to 1998. Her nickname is Brown Sugar.

Laracuente debuted as a professional boxer on February 12, 1997 in a match against Karen Nye, which Laracuente won.

On October 10, 1999, she reached a draw in four rounds with Jeanne Martinez. After winning her next fight, she went to Bay St. Louis, Mississippi, where she got arrested the night before the fight for underage gambling. She spent a night in jail, and then lost a decision in ten rounds to Denise Moraetes.

In her next bout, Laracuente beat future world champion Daniela Somers by an unanimous decision in Miami. After Somers went on to win the world title by beating Leah Melinger, Laracuente asked for a rematch, but she was denied by Somers' management.

She won three more bouts, and then she faced Zulfia Koutdoussova, losing a split decision to her.

Next came Laracuente's first world title try. Facing world champion Christy Martin at the Félix Trinidad-David Reid Pay Per View undercard, Laracuente lost a decision in eight rounds, in a bout that HBO Boxing commentator Jim Lampley said that he thought Laracuente should have won by 78 to 74 on his unofficial score.

After losing one more fight, she retired, but in December 2002 she announced plans to return into the ring, with hopes of getting a new world title chance.

On May 14, 2005, she returned, losing a decision to Mary Jo Sanders, in Kinder, Louisiana. She later lost also to Layla McCarter.

On July 8, 2005, she fought Missy Fiorentino on short notice, losing a unanimous decision to the undefeated prospect.

In 2007 Esther Phiri defeated Belinda to become a world champion.

In 2008, she appeared as a defendant on The People's Court. She was sued by a one-time cornerman who claimed Laracuente never paid him for his services. The cornerman had sued for $2500 of her $7000 purse, plus an additional $2500 for embarrassment and threats, but was awarded only $350 by judge Marilyn Milian.

Laracuente ended her boxing career on June 22, 2012, with a career record of 26-28-3 (9 KO's).

She also appeared in an episode of Made when a teenager was being made into a boxer.

Professional boxing record

See also
List of Puerto Ricans

References

External links
Boxrec.com statistics

1980 births
Living people
Puerto Rican women boxers
World boxing champions
People from Mayagüez, Puerto Rico
Super-bantamweight boxers